2022 in film is an overview of events, including award ceremonies, festivals, a list of country-specific lists of films released, and notable deaths.

Highest-grossing films

Box office records
 Avatar: The Way of Water became the 51st film to gross $1 billion worldwide, the sixth film to gross $2 billion worldwide, the sixth-fastest film to cross the billion-dollar mark at 14 days, the second-fastest to gross the $2 billion mark, the highest grossing film of 2022, and the highest-grossing film of the COVID-19 pandemic era.
 It had the 11th-biggest global opening of all time and the third-biggest global opening for a film in the pandemic era behind Spider-Man: No Way Home and Doctor Strange in the Multiverse of Madness, earning $441.7 million in its first weekend.
 It also achieved the second-highest global opening weekend ever for a film released in IMAX cinemas with $48.8 million.
 With the release of Avatar: The Way of Water, Walt Disney Studios Motion Pictures led over other film distributors in worldwide box office grosses and crossed the $4.9 billion mark for the eighth year. Disney’s cumulative gross was generated from 16 film releases across its various studio divisions.
Top Gun: Maverick became the  49th film to gross $1 billion worldwide.
Additionally, the film surpassed Mission: Impossible – Fallout (2018) to become Tom Cruise's highest-grossing film of all time at the worldwide box office and also surpassed War of the Worlds (2005) to become Cruise's highest-grossing film at the domestic box office.
It also passed The Mummy (2017) as Cruise's biggest opening weekend at the worldwide box office and also passed War of the Worlds (2005) as Cruise's biggest opening at the domestic box office and his first film to open to over $100million in the US. 
It also passed Pirates of the Caribbean: At World's End (2007), another Jerry Bruckheimer produced movie, to have the highest Memorial Day opening weekend and passed Shrek 2 (2004) to have the lowest second-weekend drop for a movie that made over $100M in its opening weekend.
The film surpassed Transformers: Dark of the Moon (2011) to become the highest-grossing film distributed solely by Paramount Pictures worldwide, and Titanic (1997) to become Paramount's highest grossing film in the United States and Canada.
The Jurassic Park franchise became the tenth film franchise to gross $6 billion with the release of Jurassic World Dominion.
Additionally, Jurassic World Dominion became the 50th film to gross $1 billion worldwide.
The Marvel Cinematic Universe became the first film franchise to gross $26 billion, $27 billion, and $28 billion with the releases of Doctor Strange in the Multiverse of Madness, Thor: Love and Thunder, and Black Panther: Wakanda Forever.
Doctor Strange in the Multiverse of Madness also surpassed Spider-Man 3 to become director Sam Raimi's highest-grossing film.
Black Panther: Wakanda Forever attained the biggest opening weekend ever for a film released in the month of November in the US and Canada with $181.3 million.
It was also the third-biggest opening weekend for a film in the US and Canada during the pandemic era, behind Spider-Man: No Way Home and Doctor Strange in the Multiverse of Madness.
 Disney Africa reported that the film set an all-time box office record in West Africa and had the biggest opening of 2022 in East Africa, as well as the second-highest box office gross ever in Southern Africa.
In Nigeria, it achieved the highest opening weekend ever for a film.
The Despicable Me and  Shrek franchises became the first animated film franchises and the 15th and 17th overall film franchises to gross $4 billion with the release of Minions: The Rise of Gru and Puss in Boots: The Last Wish.
Minions: The Rise of Gru also became the highest-grossing animated film released since the COVID-19 pandemic, surpassing the 2020 film Demon Slayer: Kimetsu no Yaiba – The Movie: Mugen Train.
Avatar became the first movie to gross more than $2.9 billion worldwide, following a worldwide re-release.

Events

Award ceremonies

Film festivals
List of some of the film festivals for 2022 that have been accredited by the International Federation of Film Producers Associations (FIAPF).

Awards

2022 films

By country/region 
List of American films of 2022
List of Australian films of 2022
List of British films of 2022
List of Bangladeshi films of 2022
List of Canadian films of 2022
List of Chinese films of 2022
List of French films of 2022
List of Hong Kong films of 2022
List of Indian films of 2022
List of Italian films of 2022
List of Japanese films of 2022
List of Nigerian films of 2022
List of Pakistani films of 2022
List of Portuguese films of 2022
List of Philippine films of 2022
List of Russian films of 2022
List of South Korean films of 2022
List of Spanish films of 2022

By genre/medium 

 List of action films of 2022
 List of animated feature films of 2022
 List of avant-garde films of 2022
 List of crime films of 2022
 List of comedy films of 2022
 List of drama films of 2022
 List of horror films of 2022
 List of science fiction films of 2022
 List of thriller films of 2022

Deaths

Notes

References

2022
Film by year